The United Suvadive Republic (Dhivehi: އެކުވެރި ސުވާދީބު ޖުމްހޫރިއްޔާ) was a short-lived breakaway state from the Kingdom of Maldives between 1958 and 1963 consisting of the three southern atolls of the Maldive archipelago: Addu Atoll, Huvadhu Atoll and Fuvahmulah. The first president of the new nation was Abdulla Afeef Didi. The secession occurred in the context of the struggle of the Maldives’ emergence as a modern nation. The United Suvadive Republic inherited a Westminster system of governance cloned from Britain along with other institutional structures.

Until the recent history of the Maldives, the southern atolls had been more affluent (plant cover and more fertile soils, seafarers going to trade abroad) than the northern atolls (where the wealth, centralized by the royal administration, came from sailor-merchants from abroad); these two ways of acquiring wealth generate two types of political power: one with a despotic tendency in the north, the other with a democratic tendency in the south.

The crown had a monopoly on grey and black amber, as well as black coral, and hired employees to collect it. Foreign ships trading to Maldives had to report their cargo, sell whatever the sultan wanted at a price he agreed to pay, and sell the rest to the people at a higher price than the crown paid.

Southern atolls built fleets of 100 to 200 dead-weight tonnage long haul ships (Arumaadu Odi) which were operational until 1960s. They were fully decked with deck-houses and large overhanging forecastles. Havaru Thinadhoo operated nine long haul ships, Gadhdhoo two ships, Nilandhoo three ships and Dhaandhoo two ships with a total of 16 ships in Huvadhu. Thinadhoo was famous throughout the Indian Ocean for their frequent trips. Thinadhoo was the wealthiest island in the country until it was forcefully depopulated and destroyed.

There were many Maldivian ships (Arumaadu Odi) in the 19th century and during the first half of the 20th century which traveled as far as Aden and Sumatra.

The accumulation of wealth outside the monopoly of the Sultan enabled the southern atolls of Maldives to form an embryo of thalassocracy.

The President of the United Suvadive Republic, Abdulla Afeef Didi, stated in a letter to the editor of The Times of London that the forming of the new republic was not due to any outside influences. It was formed with their determination to have a government elected by the people and to have economic growth which was not hindered due to influences from the Maldives monarchy. Economic and Political Weekly stated that the secession was a remarkable coincidence that came with the negotiations of Gan airport even though the Sultan of Maldives at the time accused the British of inspiring it.

The name Suvadive is derived from Huvadhoo Atoll. "Suvadiva", "Suvaidu"  or "Suvadive" (Dhivehi: ސުވާދީބު) is the ancient name for Huvadhu Atoll. The early seventeenth-century French navigator François Pyrard referred to Huvadhu as "Suadou".

Overview of southern atolls

Geography 
The southern atolls consist of Huvadhu Atoll, Fuvahmulah and Addu Atoll. The three atolls are separated from the northern atolls by the Suvadive Channel or the Huvadu Kandu, which is the broadest channel between any atolls of the Maldives. It is known as the One and a Half Degree Channel in the British Admiralty charts.

Huvadu Atoll 
Huvadu Atoll which is the largest atoll in the Maldives archipelago embracing an area of about 2,900 km2 (1,120 miles²) and around 255 islands within its boundary. It is recognized in the Guinness World Records as the Atoll with most islands in the World. It is a well-defined atoll with almost a continuous rim-reef with a deep lagoon.

Huvadu population unknown in 1958

Thinadhoo population estimated at 6000 people in 1959. (Prior to depopulation)

Thinadhoo population estimated at 1800 people after resettlement on 22nd August 1966.(After depopulation in 1959)

Fuvahmulah 
Fuvahmulah ('Fua Mulaku' in the Admiralty Chart) an atoll by itself with a single large single island in the Equatorial Channel.

Fuahmulah population unknown in 1958.

Addu Atoll 
Addu Atoll marks the southern end of the Maldive archipelago, It is formed with large islands on its eastern and western side fringed by broad barrier reefs.

Addu population estimated at 18,000 people in 1958.

Southern aristocracy 
The Southern Maldives aristocracy includes the intelligentsia class and the descendants of kings of Maldives who were exiled. Kings include Sultan Mohamed IV or Devvadhoo Rasgefaan, and those exiled includes, Sultan Hasan X, Sultan Ibrahim Mudzhiruddine and descendants of Sultan Muhammed Ghiya'as ud-din. This comprises the royal houses Isdu, Devvadhoo and Diyamigili. High political appointees and ex-Sultans were exiled to Fua Mulaku in the past.

A majority of the chief justices who served the Kingdom of Maldives were from the southern Maldives.

Prince Abdulla (later known as Ibrahim Faamuladheyri Kilegefan) was banished when he was nine years to the southern atoll of Fuvamulah from Malé after his father Sultan Muhammed Ghiya'asuddin was dethroned. His family’s lands were seized and his supporters were banished to islands. Sultan Muhammed Ghiya'asuddin is believed to have been killed after he returned from Mecca performing Haijj. Many of his descendants are from the Southern Maldives.

Ibrahim Nasir, the Prime Minister of Maldives during the formation of United Suvadive Republic was born to the Southern Atoll of Fuvahmulah and has the same ancestral grandfather as Afeef Didi (President of United Suvadive Republic), Ibrahim Faamuladheyri Kilegefan son of Sultan Muhammed Ghiya'as ud-din of Diyamigili Dynasty.

Until enactment of 1932 constitution the descendants of Sultans in Addu, Huvadhu and Fuvahmulah did not have to pay vaaru (poll tax).

Governance 
The governing bodies of the three atolls consisted of families who are related with extended families managing the atolls. Southern atolls were always self governed due the southern and northern atolls being separated by the largest oceanic gap between any other atoll of Maldives, the Huvadhu Kandu. Important governing positions in the southern atolls were hereditary.

Historically the Huvadu atoll chief had the privilege, not granted to any other atoll chief of the Maldives, to fly his own flag in his vessels and at his residence.

Direct trade 
Direct trade among the northern atolls in the Maldives except a few affluent families from the region passed through Male'. The southern atolls of Huvadu, Fuamulak and Addu until the abolishing of the Maldives Kingdom had always traded directly with Ceylon, India and East Indies ports.

Direct trade from the southern atolls created a wealthy mercantile class in Huvadu and Addu atolls.

The Kingdom of Maldives also had no options to post agents in the southern atolls for tax collection as those atolls were too remote. Even if an agent was placed, there were no effective long-term alliance towards Male' of the person to forward the collected tax to capital. Any northern Maldivian stationed there would "go native" seeing his loyalties divide after a few years.

Direct trade created a wealthy mercantile class in Southern Atolls.

It was not uncommon to see long haul dead-weight 100 to 200 tonnage fleets anchored in the southern atolls. Thinadhoo of Huvadu Atoll itself had 40 of those ships which were famous throughout the Indian Ocean. The southern ships were no longer built with the disruption of direct trade after United Suvadive Republic.

Language 
The southern atoll dialects are distinctly different to the northern language of Maldives. Each of the three atolls has a different dialect with Huvadu atoll having variations within each island.

According to Sonja Fritz, "the dialects of Maldivian represent different diachronial stages in the development of the language. Especially in the field of morphology, the amount of archaic features steadily increase from the north to the south. Within the three southernmost atolls (of the Maldives), the dialect of the Addu islands which form the southern tip of the whole archipelago is characterized by the highest degree of archaicity". From Malé to the south up to Huvadhu Atoll the number of archaic features increases, but from Huvadhu Atoll the archaic features decrease towards the south. The dialect of Huvadhu is characterized by the highest degree of archaicity.

Causes to forming of United Suvadive Republic

Lack of elementary needs 
One of the main reasons to the formation of United Suvadive Republic according to a letter sent by Afeef Didi to the Times of London highlighted on the indifference shown by the central government to the people of the southern atolls. These includes government provided lack of elementary needs such as food, clothing, medicine, education, social welfare, etc. The letter also referred one of the reasons to taxation imposed on the people which caused revolts from those who had nothing to give.

In the letter he also mentioned about the southern atolls being deprived of elementary needs such as government assigned doctors, schooling, communication facilities or public utilities. Seasonal epidemics such as flu, malaria, enteritis, typhoid, diarrhea, conjunctivitis outbreaks caused deaths annually, and when appealed to, the central government refused to help.

Another reason being food prices being too high in southern atolls due to the central government selling them at high prices while purchasing southern dried fish at lower prices to be exported to Ceylon.

Lack of infrastructure 
The Maldives' economic development was hampered by a lack of land-based resources and human capital, as well as a long-standing feudal structure. The Maldives lacked the necessary infrastructure (ports, airports, hospitals, schools, harbors, and telecommunications, as well as people resources) to enter the twenty-first century as a self-sufficient nation until the late 1950s and 1960s. Even though the Maldives initially felt the impact of the industrial revolution in Europe in 1850, when Indian merchants brought luxury goods to Malé, residents on the outer islands never experienced such luxury.

Lack of education 
All the riches and education were reserved for the ruling elites and aristocracy of Malé, and islanders lived in isolation from Malé and the rest of the world.

Travel restrictions 
In addition to elitism, islanders faced other challenges. Only Malé's elites were allowed to go freely overseas for academics or business, while the rest of the Maldivians were subjected to a number of limitations.

Trade restrictions
World War II discouraged many from trading by ship due to the perils of war.

Until then Huvadhu and Addu had established frequent trading to the ports of Colombo, Galle in Ceylon. With World War II the central authorities had their first opportunity to impose restrictions to the southern atolls to restrict trade and gain an advantage over them.

Maldives diplomats in Colombo with the co-operation of the British authorities managed to monitor the southern merchants who traded from Colombo. The central authorities in Maldives exerted requirements to carry passports for the first time in 1947 which were to be issued from Maldives. The impact to the economy due to the trade restrictions was resented by the southern merchants and population.

Unfair taxation 
The success of imposing trade restriction gave the Maldives central authorities the opportunity to impose Vaaru (poll tax) and Varuvaa (land tax) on the southern atolls. The restrictions on trade and the imposition of new taxing angered the population. World War II had an enormous impact on the Maldives as the main export of dried fish could not be exported and lack of importation of staples caused severe privation and even famine.

Trading of even single coconuts or barters to the British troops were recorded through the government by the militia officers stationed in Addu and Havaru Thinadhoo to ensure taxation was imposed.

Riots due to taxing 
Riots spread across Hithadhoo on the New Year's Eve of 1959 due to the government announcing new taxation on boats. The impending disaster due to angry mobs trying to attack government facilities was informed by Abdulla Afeef Didi getting the officials to safety in British-controlled areas.

Provoking of southern aristocracy 
The final blow to the harmony of the Southern atolls were from the arrest and physical assault on Ahmed Didi by one of the officials sent from Male'. Ahmed Didi was the son of Elha Didi who was a member of the leading families of Hithadhoo. Ahmed Didi was beaten until he bled from his nose and mouth. News had traveled to the community that he had been beaten to death.

On this event there was an uprising against the official who beat Ahmed Didi who fled taking refuge at the British barracks.

An investigation undertaken by the central authorities prevailed the account of events told by the person who assaulted Ahmed Didi, in turn convicted Abdulla Afeef Didi. He was sentenced to public flogging, to be beaten by two cat o' nine tails and chili paste rubbed into the wounds.

The investigation was said to have been overlooked by Al-Ameer Hassan Fareed who visited Addu and had soon departed to Colombo afterwards. On the way to Colombo he met his unfortunate demise from a World War II submarine attack.

The Addu nobles were accused of the death of Al-Ameer Hassan Fareed, claiming it to have been due to sorcery and were punished after they were brought to Male'.

Halting of constructions in Addu atoll 
By the end of 1957 the Sultan had appointed Ibrahim Nasir as Prime Minister. After being appointed Ibrahim Nasir had soon ordered the British to halt all construction work in Addu where an airbase and hospital was being built.

Surplus of skilled workers 
Prior to forming of the new nation, hundreds of workers in Addu had modern skills. Some were foremen of electric works, construction, vehicle maintenance and even chefs and were accustomed to living in large houses with tape recorders and imported cigarettes; which were luxurious goods to Maldives at the time. The atoll also had an enormous increase of population from 6000 to 17000 within 19 years due to excellent medical service by the British. Its high skilled worker population had grown to an extent that it was no longer supported by food resources from those who lacked skills which required importation of food.

Limits to southern atoll development 
According to Clarence Maloney in "The Maldives: New Stresses in an Old Nation", Afeef Didi stated that the Kingdom of Maldives was principally only concerned with the welfare of Male'. Towns other than Male' was an alien concept to Maldivians, hence there is no word that signifies 'Town', 'City' or 'Village' in Maldivian language.

The affluence of Addu and Huvadhu merchants was always resented by the mercantile classes in Male' and lack of cooperation from the capital hindered and limited its economic growth.

Secession of the United Suvadive Republic

Declaring independence by Addu atoll 
On January 3, 1959 (Some sources state the year of declaration of independence as 1958 ) a delegation of the Addu people arrived on Gan and declared their independence to the British. The delegation also insisted that Afeef be their leader.

Formation of United Suvadive Republic 
The three atolls Huvadu, Fuamulah and Addu formed the United Suvadive Republic by breaking away from the sovereign authority of the Sultan on 13 March 1959.

Economic prosperity 
United Suvadive Republic established the Adduan Trading Corporation for exports and Imports, and founded the first bank in the Maldives. The new British pound economy based on democratic principles boomed to a degree of prosperity unseen to its population.

Aftermath

Depopulation of Havaru Thinadhoo 
On the 4th February 1962 the Kingdom of Maldives reacted by sending a fully armed gunboat to Havaru Thinadhoo commanded by Prime Minister Ibrahim Nasir.

End of United Suvadive Republic 
On 30 September 1963, the President of the United Suvadive Republic Afeef Didi was evacuated to Seychelles for his safety which was also the end of the short lived republic.

Parliament of the United Suvadive Republic 
List of Addu Atoll members for the Parliament of United Suvadive Republic. The rest of the two atolls, Huvadu and Fuvahmulah, could not hold elections due to military action from the Male' government.

 Hithadhoo 
17 members
 Meedhoo 
7 members
 Hulhudhoo 
8 members
 Gan Feydhoo 
10 members
 Maradhoo Feydhoo 
3 members
 Maradhoo 
6 members

Appointed by the President of U.S.R 
 Mohamed Ibrahim Didi

References

External links 
 Symbols of the Suvadive State
 Suvadive Coat of Arms
 Historical Information
 United Suvadive Republic
 Suvadive Parliament

 
History of the Maldives
Former countries in South Asia
Island countries of the Indian Ocean
Atolls of the Maldives
States and territories established in 1959
Former republics